Borislav "Gajica" Đurović (Cyrillic: Борислав Ђуровић; 12 March 1952 – 25 April 2003) was a Montenegrin footballer.

Club career
Nicknamed Gajica, Đurović started his career at hometown club Sutjeska, but was not allowed by them to move to a bigger club after Sutjeska's relegation in 1973. After two years without playing, he finally joined Partizan for whom he played 313 games in all competitions and scoring 14 games and won two league titles. He scored for Partizan in the 1978–79 European Cup against East German side Dynamo Dresden.

He later had two seasons abroad in Spain, with Real Valladolid.

Death
He suddenly died in 2003, aged only 51. A fountain was erected by Partizan in his honour in Nikšić.

Honours
Partizan
 Yugoslav First League: 1975–76, 1977–78.

References

External links

 Foto arhiva- Borislav Đurović (1952 – 2003) - CRNO-BELA NOSTALGIJA 

1952 births
2003 deaths
Footballers from Nikšić
Association football fullbacks
Yugoslav footballers
FK Sutjeska Nikšić players
FK Partizan players
Real Valladolid players
Yugoslav First League players
La Liga players
Yugoslav expatriate footballers
Expatriate footballers in Spain
Yugoslav expatriate sportspeople in Spain
FK Partizan non-playing staff